Troll: The Tale of a Tail is a 2018 Norwegian-Canadian computer-animated high fantasy adventure film directed by Kristian Kamp and co-directed by Kevin Munroe. A co-production between the Norwegian Sagatoon and Canadian Blue Bug Entertainment, the film was released on 25 December 2018, for a worldwide gross of $1,080,895. With a budget of 120 million Norwegian krone, it is one of the most expensive Norwegian films ever made.

Premise 
Trym, the prince of the trolls, and a small group of friends have to embark on a journey to Draugen to save his father, King Grom, who has been turned into stone and had his tail stolen by an evil tyrant.

Production 
Production for the film lasted 15 years, beginning in 2003 and concluding in 2018. The budget of 120 million Norwegian krone was financed entirely by private investors. According to director Kamp, he wanted to do everything in Norway, however it did not work out financially. Kamp went to look elsewhere for funding for the film, and traveled to India, Germany and the United States, before ending up in Canada, where the studio Blue Bug Entertainment agreed to help finance the film.

Release and reception 
The film was released in Norwegian theatres on 25 December 2018, and grossed $199,547 in its opening week for a total of $725,387 during its entire theatrical run. It grossed $1,080,895 worldwide.

Einar Aarvig of  gave the film four out of six stars, saying: "As soon as one accepts that Troll: The Tale of a Tail does not have much to do with either Norwegian folklore or Asbjørnsen and Moe's management of it, it turns out to be a pretty fun children's film."

Troll: The Tale of a Tail was nominated for "Best Children's Film" at the 2019 Amanda Awards, but lost to Psychobitch.

References

External links 

Troll: The Tale of a Tail at the Norwegian Film Institute (in Norwegian)

Norwegian animated films
2018 films
Norwegian children's films
2010s children's films
Films about trolls